Teddy is the third album by R&B crooner Teddy Pendergrass, released in 1979. It included more "bedroom ballads" than his prior releases, and was compared to Marvin Gaye's I Want You album.

Two singles were released from the album: "Turn Off the Lights", which reached US Pop #48 and #2 on the R&B charts, and "Come Go With Me," which reached #14 R&B.

The album was nominated for an American Music Award, Favorite Soul/R&B Album in 1980 and 1981.

Track listing
All tracks composed by Kenny Gamble and Leon Huff; except where indicated
 "Come Go With Me"
 "Turn Off the Lights"
 "I'll Never See Heaven Again" (LeRoy Bell, Casey James)
 "All I Need Is You" (Darnell Jordan, Sherman Marshall)
 "If You Know Like I Know" (Jerry Cohen, Gene McFadden, John Whitehead)
 "Do Me"
 "Set Me Free" (Bell, James)
 "Life Is a Circle"

Personnel
Teddy Pendergrass - lead and backing vocals
Leon Huff - keyboards
Thom Bell - keyboards, backing vocals
Charles Collins, Keith Benson, Quinton Joseph - drums
Bobby Eli, Dennis Harris, Roland Chambers, Tony Bell - guitar
Bob Babbitt, Jimmy Williams - bass
Lenny Pakula - organ
David Cruse - percussion
Don Renaldo & His Horns and Strings - strings, horns
Barbara Ingram, Carl Helm, Carla Benson, Evette Benton, Joseph Jefferson - backing vocals
Jack Faith, Tony Bell, Dexter Wansel, Jerry Cohen, Larry Gold, John L. Usry Jnr., Thom Bell - arrangements
Technical
Ed Lee - design
Frank Laffitte - photography

Charts

Weekly charts

Year-end charts

Singles

See also
List of number-one R&B albums of 1979 (U.S.)

References

External links
 Teddy Pendergrass-Teddy at Discogs

1979 albums
Teddy Pendergrass albums
Albums produced by Kenneth Gamble
Albums produced by Leon Huff
Albums produced by Thom Bell
Albums arranged by Thom Bell
Albums recorded at Sigma Sound Studios
Philadelphia International Records albums